Gnaphosa limbata is a ground spider species found in Norway.

See also 
 List of Gnaphosidae species

References

External links 

Gnaphosidae
Spiders of Europe
Spiders described in 1900